The Journal of Stem Cells & Regenerative Medicine is an open-access online scientific journal. It is the official journal of the  German Society for Stem Cell Research (GSZ) and publishes research articles focusing on stem cells and regenerative medicine and related fields. The journal is indexed in databases like PubMed, Scopus, DOAJ, EMBASE, Elsevier databases, Index Copernicus & Google Scholar.

Types of articles
The journal publishes:
 Editorials
 Review articles
 Original articles
 Brief communications/case reports
 News and opinions
 Letters to the editor
 Proceedings of meetings

External links
 

Open access journals
Publications established in 2007
Regenerative medicine journals
Biannual journals
English-language journals